Franz Karl may refer to:

 Franz Karl (general) (1888–1964), Generalleutnant in the Wehrmacht during World War II
 Archduke Franz Karl of Austria (1802–1878), father of the emperors Franz Joseph I of Austria and Maximilian I of Mexico
 Franz Karl of Auersperg (1660–1713), Prince of Auersperg

See also